The 1972 Northwestern Wildcats team represented Northwestern University during the 1972 Big Ten Conference football season. In their ninth and final year under head coach Alex Agase, the Wildcats compiled a 2–9 record (1–8 against Big Ten Conference opponents) and finished in last place in the Big Ten Conference.

The team's offensive leaders were quarterback Mitch Anderson with 1,335 passing yards, Greg Boykin with 625 rushing yards, and Jim Lash with 667 receiving yards. Five Northwestern player received All-Big Ten honors. They are: (1) tight end Steve Craig (AP-1, UPI-1); (2) split end Jim Lash (UPI-1); (3) defensive back Greg Strunk (AP-2, UPI-2); (4) defensive lineman Jim Anderson (AP-2); and (5) running back Greg Boykin (AP-2).

Schedule

Roster

References

Northwestern
Northwestern Wildcats football seasons
Northwestern Wildcats football